Valery Sigalevitch (Russian: Валерий Львович Сигалевич, Valerij Lvovič Sigalevič; born March, 4 1950) is a Russian classical concert pianist.

Biography
Sigalevitch was born in Simferopol, Crimea. His father Lev Sigalevitch was a painter and his mother a concert pianist and professor. He began playing the piano at the age of six and, showing prodigious talent, was accepted at the special music class of the Leningrad Conservatory at age seven to study  with Leah Zelikhman. He continued his studies at the Moscow Tchaikovsky Conservatory in the class of Vera Gornostayeva. He finished his studies  winning the first prize. In 1977 he left the Soviet Union and emigrated to Israel. For the next two years he studied with Nikita Magaloff in Geneva and with Arie Vardi in Tel Aviv. His repertoire includes works by J.S. Bach, Haydn, Mozart, Beethoven, Schubert, Liszt, Brahms, Mussorgsky, Debussy, Ravel, Scriabin, Rachmaninoff, Prokofiev and other composers. It is,  however, Chopin's and Schumann's works which occupy a central position in his repertoire. Since commencing his concert career, he has received numerous enthusiastic reviews from critics in Europe and Israel. He has often played under the baton of Valery Gergiev.

He is also a dedicated connoisseur of paintings, literature, and philosophy. He currently resides in La Rochelle.

Sigalevitch's discography includes the complete works for solo piano by Robert Schumann (14 CDs) released in 2016 for Polyphonia Records.

A sought-after pedagogue, many of his students are prizewinners of important competitions. Among them were Ingmar Lazar and Jules Matton.

Sources
 Biography from the album "Valery Sigalevitch spielt Chopin" Colosseum COL 0646.

External links 

 Website of Polyphonia Records

1950 births
Living people
Musicians from Simferopol
Russian classical pianists
Male classical pianists
Russian Jews
Jewish classical pianists
Moscow Conservatory alumni
21st-century classical pianists
21st-century Russian male musicians